was a village located in Minamikanbara District, Niigata Prefecture, Japan.

As of 2003, the village had an estimated population of 11,118 and a density of 35.75 persons per km². The total area was 311.00 km².

On May 1, 2005, Shitada, along with the town of Sakae (also from Minamikanbara District), was merged into the expanded city of Sanjō.

Transportation

Railway
JNR Yahiko Line had been operated in the village until 1984.

Highway

Local attractions
 Yagigahana (:ja:八木ヶ鼻)
 Echigo-Nagano Onsen (:ja:越後長野温泉)

Dissolved municipalities of Niigata Prefecture
Sanjō, Niigata